Peter Younghusband (born 17 February 1990) is a New Zealand cricketer. He made his List A debut for Wellington on 21 January 2015 in the 2014–15 Ford Trophy. He made his Twenty20 debut for Wellington on 30 December 2016 in the 2016–17 Super Smash. He made his first-class debut for Wellington on 25 February 2017 in the 2016–17 Plunket Shield season.

In June 2018, he was awarded a contract with Wellington for the 2018–19 season. In June 2020, he was offered a contract by Wellington ahead of the 2020–21 domestic cricket season.

Younghusband was educated at Nelson College from 2005 to 2007.

References

External links
 

1990 births
Living people
New Zealand cricketers
Wellington cricketers
Sportspeople from Harare
Zimbabwean emigrants to New Zealand
People educated at Nelson College